Gymnopilus terricola is a species of mushroom in the family Hymenogastraceae.

See also

List of Gymnopilus species

External links
Gymnopilus terricola at Index Fungorum

terricola